Tony Daykin (born May 3, 1955 in Taipei, Taiwan) is a former player in the NFL. He played for the Detroit Lions and the Atlanta Falcons. He played collegiately for the Georgia Tech football team. He is currently a math teacher and assistant football coach at Carlton J. Kell High School in Marietta, Georgia. He is distinguished as being the first person born in Taiwan to play in the National Football League.

References

Living people
1955 births
American football linebackers
Taiwanese players of American football
Georgia Tech Yellow Jackets football players
Detroit Lions players
Atlanta Falcons players
Sportspeople from Taipei